The Metrobus is the massive bus transportation system that operates in the districts of Panama, San Miguelito and Colón. The system began operations on December 28, 2010, replacing the "diablo rojo" bus system (used school buses from the United States) that existed for several decades. It travels the main roads of Panama City (Vía España, Vía Simón Bolívar or Transístmica, Vía Ricardo J. Alfaro or Tumba Muerto, Avenida Balboa / Vía Israel and Avenida Domingo Díaz), the main toll highways (Corredor Norte and Corredor Sur ), as well as other minor transversal routes. In Colón the route is from Altos de Los Lagos-city center. The MiBus transport service is expected to be implemented in the Arraiján District and the western sector of the country.

The system is in charge of the MiBus company, initially managed by the Colombian-Panamanian consortium Transporte Masivo de Panamá until 2015, when the Panamanian government bought and assumed the operations of the company (remaining under the umbrella of the Panama Metro) and hired the American company First Transit, a subsidiary of FirstGroup, in the administrative part.

Body (Gran Viale) 
The buses were manufactured in Colombia and Brazil by the Volvo company, where the bodywork is assembled by the Brazilian firm Marcopolo. Each unit has two doors, two fire extinguishers, eight stop buttons and six hammers in case of fire, has air conditioning and led signs of the route in the upper front part (made by the Mobitec company). Each vehicle contains 38 seats (with two preferential seats designated for pregnant women, seniors and people with limited capacity) and two spaces for the disabled (located in the central part).

below the specifications:

 Air Conditioning: EBERSPAECHER / THERMOKING

 Length: 12 meters

 Number of Chairs: 35

 User Capacity 80

 Fire Fighting System: Automatic

 Stop Bells: 8

Card 
The boarding of the buses must be done through a smart card, implemented as of February 15, 2012. The administration and platform of the card system is in charge of the Chilean company Sonda S.A..

There are three types of cards: a regular one, a special one for college students and a "3 in 1" called Rapi pass, which joins the departure of the Albrook Transportation Terminal, the Metro bus and Line 1 of the Panama Metro. Rates range from B /. 0.10 for students, B /. 0.25 for regular passengers (standard) and B /. 0.75 on corridor and highway routes. The cost of the card is two balboas, which can be recharged at different points in the city, especially at the Albrook Transport Terminal and Paid Zones.

New Metrobuses (Torino) 
The new buses are brought from Brazil by Marcopolo in 2017 and are used for the Corredor Norte and Corredor Sur routes.

Marcopolo improved the air conditioning system since the previous buses the air conditioning was not powerful enough to cope with the climate of the country. On the side it removes the logo (Metrobus) to place the name of the company that manages it (MiBus).

below the specifications:

 Air Conditioning: EBERSPAECHER

 Length: 13.2 meters

 Number of Chairs: 482 Seats

 User Capacity: 80

 Fire Fighting System: Automatic

 Stop Bell: 11

References 

Road transport in Panama
Bus transport in North America